Hans-Martin Linde (born 24 May 1930 in Werne, Germany) is a noted virtuoso flute and recorder player of (mainly) baroque and early music. 
  
He authored a number of original and highly instructive books on the flute and recorder respectively.

 Recorder Player Handbook (Handbuch des Blockflötenspiels, 1997)
 Complete F recorder method
 Complete C recorder method
 Studies in the French clef for recorder
 History of fipple-flutes

He then set up the Linde Consort (a baroque orchestra) and has made numerous recordings.

External links
Short biography with some photos

1930 births
Living people
People from Iserlohn
German classical flautists
Academic staff of Schola Cantorum Basiliensis
German recorder players
German male writers